John Joseph Slater Jr. (November 25, 1925 – July 17, 1998) was an American lawyer and politician who served as mayor of Chelsea, Massachusetts and as a member of the Massachusetts House of Representatives.

Early life
Slater was born on November 27, 1925 in Chelsea. During World War II he was a radio operator for the United States Navy in the Pacific theater. Slater graduated from Boston College and Boston College Law School.

Political career
From 1960 to 1963, Slater was a member of the Chelsea board of aldermen. From 1964 to 1969 he was the mayor of Chelsea. He then represented the 16th Suffolk district in the Massachusetts House of Representatives from 1969 to 1971.

During the administration of mayor Kevin White, Slater served as the assistant corporation counsel for the City of Boston. He then served as assistant counsel to the Massachusetts House of Representatives.

Personal life and death
He was married to Natalie M. Fothergill and together they had six children. One of his children, John J. Slater III is also a lawyer.
Slater died on July 17, 1998 of pancreatic cancer at Massachusetts General Hospital.

References

1925 births
1998 deaths
United States Navy personnel of World War II
Boston College alumni
Boston College Law School alumni
Deaths from pancreatic cancer
Massachusetts lawyers
Mayors of Chelsea, Massachusetts
Democratic Party members of the Massachusetts House of Representatives
20th-century American politicians
20th-century American lawyers